Ctenelmis is a genus of riffle beetles (insects in the family Elmidae). Species are found near rivers in South Africa.

References

External links 

 

Elmidae
Byrrhoidea genera